The Brazilian teal or Brazilian duck (Amazonetta brasiliensis) is the only duck in the genus Amazonetta. It is widely distributed in eastern South America.

Taxonomy
The Brazilian teal was formally described in 1789 by the German naturalist Johann Friedrich Gmelin in his revised and expanded edition of Carl Linnaeus's Systema Naturae. He placed it with all the other ducks, swans and geese in the genus Anas and coined the binomial name Anas brasiliensis.  Gmelin based his description on the Mareca alia species (the second Mareca) that was described in 1648 by the German naturalist Georg Marcgrave in his Historia Naturalis Brasiliae. The Brazilian teal is now the only species placed in the genus Amazonetta that was introduced by the German zoologist Hans von Boetticher in 1929.

It was formerly considered a perching duck, but more recent analyses indicate that it belongs to a clade of South American dabbling ducks which also includes the crested duck, the bronze-winged duck, and possibly the steamer ducks.

Two subspecies are recognised:
 A. b. brasiliensis (Gmelin, 1789) – the nominate race, found in Brazil, Suriname, Guyana, French Guiana, central Venezuela, eastern Colombia, and northeastern Peru
 A. b. ipecutiri (Vieillot, 1816) – found in Brazil, northern Argentina, eastern Bolivia, Uruguay, and Paraguay

Description
The ducks are light brown in colour. Drakes distinguish themselves from females in having red beaks and legs, and in having a distinctive pale grey area on the side of its head and neck. The colour of these limbs is much duller in females.

Distribution and habitat
They can be found throughout eastern South America, from central Brazil, to Uruguay, to northern and eastern Argentina, Paraguay, central Venezuela, northeastern Peru, Suriname, Guyana, French Guiana, eastern Bolivia, and eastern Colombia. Their preferred habitat is a body of freshwater away from the coast with dense vegetation nearby.

Behaviour
Brazilian teal live in pairs or in small groups of up to twenty birds. Both parents look after their hatchlings. They eat seeds, fruits, roots and insect, while ducklings eat only insects.

Status
They are plentiful and are listed as of Least Concern.

References

External links

 Short description and pictures
 

Anatinae
Ducks
Birds of South America
Birds of the Guianas
Birds of Brazil
Birds of Venezuela
Birds of Argentina
Birds of Uruguay
Birds described in 1789
Taxa named by Johann Friedrich Gmelin